The Visiting Forces Act 1952 is an Act of the Parliament of the United Kingdom.

Section 3 provides immunity against prosecution for certain offences in the courts of United Kingdom by members of visiting forces and, by virtue of the 1964 Act, international headquarters. See offence against the person and offence against property for the meaning of those terms.

The Act is extended by section 1(2) of, and the Schedule to the International Headquarters and Defence Organisations Act 1964.

Extent
The Act applies specifically to the forces of the countries (mostly members of the Commonwealth of Nations) listed in s.1(1)(a) (as amended from time to time) and additionally to the forces of any other country authorised by an Order in Council.

The Act is in force throughout the United Kingdom.

References

External links

United Kingdom Acts of Parliament 1952
United Kingdom military law
1952 in military history